Phaeoxantha aequinoctialis is a species of tiger beetle in the subfamily Cicindelinae that was described by Dejean in 1825. The species is found in South American countries like Argentina, Bolivia, Brazil, Colombia, Ecuador, French Guiana, Peru, and Venezuela.

References

Beetles described in 1825
Beetles of South America